Abu Abd Allah Muhammad ibn Muhammad al-Ifrani al-Susi al-Marrakushi (1669/1670), called al-Saghir, was a Moroccan historian and biographer.

Biography 
al-Ifrani was born in 1669/1670 in Marrakesh. His family was from the Ifran tribe, a Shilha Berber tribe of the Draa River basin in the Sous region. He began his studies in his hometown, where he followed the courses of the scholar, Abu al-Abbas Ahmad ibn 'Ali al-Mawasi as-Susi (d. 1718). Then he went to Fez to continue his studies in the al-Qarawiyyin, where he attended the lessons of scholars such as Ahmad ibn Abd el-Hayy al-Halabi and Muhammad ibn Abd al-Rahman ibn Abd al-Qadir al-Fasi.

Works 
Some of his works are:

 Nuzhat al-hddi bi-akhbar muluk al-Qarn al-Hadi, a chronicle of the Saadid sultans of Morocco
 al-Maslak as-sahl fi sharh tawchih Ibn Sahl, a commentary on Tawshih or Muwashshah of the Andalusian poet, Ibn Sahl
 Safwat man intashar min akhbar sulaha' al-qarn al-addi 'ashar, a compilation of biographies of 17th-century Moroccan saints
 az-Zill al-warif fi mafakhir Mawlana Ismail ibn al-Sharif (or Rawdat at-tarif), a monograph on the Alaouite sultan of Morocco, Moulay Ismail Ibn Sharif
 Durar al-hijal fi ma'athir sab'at rijal, a monograph on the Seven Saints of Marrakesh
 al-Mu'rib fi akhbar al-Maghrib, a general history of Morocco until his time

References

Sources 

 
 

1670 births
1740s deaths
17th-century Berber people
18th-century Berber people
17th-century Moroccan historians
18th-century Moroccan historians
Berber historians
Berber writers
Moroccan biographers
People from Marrakesh
Shilha people